Ludmila Manicler (born 6 July 1987) is an Argentine footballer and futsal player who plays as a forward. She is a former member of the Argentina women's national team.

She's 163 cm tall and has a weight of 48.40 kg. She previously played for FC Barcelona in Spain's Primera División.

Manicler scored the first Argentine goal in an olympic competition on the 1–2 defeat against Canada at the 2008 Summer Olympics women's tournament.
Her first international competition was the 2006 FIFA U-20 Women's World Cup, where she scored 3 goals.

Manicler has also played for Club Atlético Independiente in Argentina and Santiago Morning of Chile's Women 1st Division.

References

External links
Ludmila Manicler at FutbolEsta.com 

1987 births
Living people
Sportspeople from Buenos Aires Province
Argentine women's footballers
Women's association football forwards
Primera División (women) players
FC Barcelona Femení players
Boca Juniors (women) footballers
Club Atlético River Plate (women) players
Santiago Morning (women) footballers
Argentina women's international footballers
2007 FIFA Women's World Cup players
Footballers at the 2008 Summer Olympics
Olympic footballers of Argentina
Argentine expatriate women's footballers
Argentine expatriate sportspeople in Chile
Expatriate women's footballers in Chile
Argentine expatriate sportspeople in Spain
Expatriate women's footballers in Spain
Argentine women's futsal players
Independiente (women) players